Groeber is a German surname. Notable people with the surname include:

 Adolf Groeber (1854-1919), German politician (Centre Party)
 John Groeber (1903 – 1973), missionary who founded the Serima mission station for the Swiss Bethlehem Mission in Rhodesia
 Gast Groeber (born 1960), writer from Luxembourg
 Hermann Groeber (1865 – 1935), German painter
 Pablo Groeber (1885–1964), German geologist known

See also 

 Grober (disambiguation)

German-language surnames